Jyotirmoy Basu (18 December 1920 – 12 January 1982) was an Indian politician. He was elected to the Lok Sabha, lower house of the Parliament of India from the Diamond Harbour constituency of West Bengal in 1967,1971,1977 and 1980 as a member of the Communist Party of India (Marxist).

References

External links
 Official biographical sketch in Parliament of India website

1920 births
Communist Party of India (Marxist) politicians from West Bengal
Lok Sabha members from West Bengal
India MPs 1967–1970
India MPs 1971–1977
India MPs 1977–1979
India MPs 1980–1984
1982 deaths
People from South 24 Parganas district
Communist Party of India politicians from West Bengal